Cimensis is a Latin adjective meaning "from Cima", referring to either Ilhéu de Cima of Cape Verde or Ilhéu de Cima of Madeira. It may refer to several species:

Amphorella cimensis, a species of snails found in Madeira
Esperiopsis cimensis, a species of sponges found in Cape Verde
Nesarpalus cimensis, a species of beetles found in Madeira
Pseudococcus cimensis, a species of mealy bugs found in Madeira

It also may refer to a subspecies:
Scarites abbreviatus cimensis, a subspecies of Scarites abbreviatus found in Madeira